Mithani is a major city of Sindh situated at the left bank of river Indus near Moro in the district Naushahro Feroze Sindh. This town's population is about 40,000.

Populated places in Sindh